Clarence Bernard Orme (April 3, 1899 – June 12, 1968) was an American Negro league second baseman in the 1920s.

A native of Chamois, Missouri, Orme played for the Kansas City Monarchs in 1920. In his nine recorded plate appearances, he posted no hits, but walked three times, stole a base, and scored a run. Orme died in Kansas City, Missouri in 1968 at age 69.

References

External links
 and Seamheads

1899 births
1968 deaths
Date of death missing
Kansas City Monarchs players
Baseball second basemen
Baseball players from Missouri
People from Osage County, Missouri
20th-century African-American sportspeople